Libbey may refer to:

Surname
 Artemus Libbey (1823–1894), Maine Supreme Judicial Court justice
 Edward Libbey (1854–1925), founder of Libbey Glass Company
 Harry Libbey (1843–1913), U.S. Representative from Virginia
 J. Aldrich Libbey (1864–1925), American vaudeville performer, actor, singer and songwriter
 Laura Jean Libbey (1862–1924), American writer
 Neil Libbey, American-born author and historian in Nova Scotia
 William Libbey (1855–1927), American professor of physical geography

Other uses
 Libbey Incorporated, a glass product manufacturer in Toledo, Ohio
 Libbey High School, a public high school in Toledo, Ohio
 Edward D. Libbey House, a National Historic Landmark in Toledo, Ohio

See also
 Libbey-Owens-Ford, an American glass company
 Libby (disambiguation)